The 2018–19 season was Al Ain Football Club's 45rd in existence and the club's 43st consecutive season in the top-level football league in the UAE. In December 2018, Al Ain which celebrated the 50th anniversary participating in the 2018 FIFA Club World Cup, representing the host nation as the reigning champions of the UAE Pro-League, Al Ain defeated Copa Libertadores champions River Plate by penalties hosted in home stadium Hazza Bin Zayed Stadium to enter the final for the first time in team history and became the first Emirati club to reach the decisive match. The final, on 22 December, was lost 4–1 to UEFA Champions League winners Real Madrid at the Zayed Sports City Stadium in Abu Dhabi.

Players

First Team

Transfers

Competitions

Overview

UAE Pro-League

League table

Results summary

Results by round

Matches

UAE Super Cup

President's Cup

League Cup

Group B

Knockout stage

FIFA Club World Cup

In the first round on 12 December, Al-Ain defeated Team Wellington in a penalty shoot-out following a 3–3 draw at their home stadium, Hazza bin Zayed Stadium. Wellington, a semi-professional club that qualified as the OFC Champions League champion, entered halftime with a 3–1 lead that was cut back by an equalising volley from Marcus Berg. The match remained scoreless after extra time and advanced to a penalty shoot-out, which Al-Ain won 4–3 after five rounds after goalkeeper Khalid Eisa made two saves.

Al-Ain advanced to face African champions Espérance de Tunis in the second round match, held three days later at Hazza bin Zayed Stadium. The team defeated Espérance 3–0 in an upset that began with two goals scored in the opening 16 minutes. Al-Ain produced a larger upset in the semi-finals, defeating Copa Libertadores champions River Plate in a penalty shoot-out to advance to the Club World Cup final. The match began with two early goals for River Plate scored by Rafael Santos Borré following an opening strike from Berg; after an equalising goal was disallowed by the video assistant referee, Caio Lucas Fernandes scored for Al-Ain in the 51st minute to draw the teams level at 2–2. After a scoreless extra time, aided by goalkeeper Essa's saves, Al-Ain defeated River Plate 5–4 in a penalty shoot-out, its second of the competition, with Essa making one save on River's Enzo Pérez. The semi-final upset of River was called the "greatest achievement" in Emirati football history by Al-Ain manager Zoran Mamić.

AFC Champions League

Group stage

Group C

Statistics

Squad appearances and goals

|-
! colspan=16 style=background:#dcdcdc; text-align:center| Goalkeepers

|-
! colspan=16 style=background:#dcdcdc; text-align:center| Defenders

|-
! colspan=16 style=background:#dcdcdc; text-align:center| Midfielders

|-
! colspan=16 style=background:#dcdcdc; text-align:center| Forwards

|-
! colspan=16 style=background:#dcdcdc; text-align:center| Players transferred out during the season

Goalscorers
Includes all competitive matches. The list is sorted alphabetically by surname when total goals are equal.

Assists

Clean sheets
Includes all competitive matches.

References

External links
 Al Ain FC official website 

2018-19
Emirati football clubs 2018–19 seasons
Ain